Shaftesbury Settlement is an unincorporated community in Alberta, Canada within the Municipal District of Peace No. 135 that is recognized as a designated place by Statistics Canada. It is adjacent to the Town of Peace River to the north on the west shore of the Peace River.

The Shaftesbury Formation, a stratigraphic unit of the Western Canadian Sedimentary Basin was named for the settlement.  

The community was named after Anthony Ashley-Cooper, 7th Earl of Shaftesbury when it was founded by Rev John Gough Brick in 1888 as an Anglican mission where Natives would be taught agriculture as their old ways were collapsing and they were living in want and hunger  - he was from Upton-upon-Severn, Worcestershire.

A telegraph line was extended from Edmonton to Shaftesbury in 1910 or 1911. This accommodated telephone communication as well an provided the first rapid means of news and communication for the area.

Demographics 

See also 
List of communities in Alberta
List of designated places in Alberta
List of settlements in Alberta

References 

Designated places in Alberta
Localities in the Municipal District of Peace No. 135
Settlements in Alberta